Tomi Janežič is a Slovenian theatre director, professor at the Academy for Theatre, Radio, Film, and Television (AGRFT)  in Ljubljana, Slovenia, and a psychodrama psychotherapist. He is also one of the founders and the artistic director of the Studio for Research on the Art of Acting which runs its activities mostly at Krušče Workcenter for Artistic Research, Creation, Residency and Education in Krušče, Slovenia.

Education
Janežič obtained his BA and MA degrees in theatre directing from the Academy of Theatre, Radio, Film and Television (AGRFT) in Ljubljana, and was later educated in Slovenia and abroad, particularly in the field of various acting techniques and psychodrama. He also finished introductory studies of Group Analysis (Institute for Group Analysis Ljubljana). He obtained the Psychodrama Psychotherapist Certificate after finishing the International Psychodrama Education of Belgrade Institute of Psychodrama and Zagreb Center for Psychodrama.

Career

Tomi Janežič worked in most of the former Yugoslav countries. 
Janežič has directed or lectured in more than a dozen of different countries (from former Yugoslav countries to Bulgaria, Slovakia, România, Italy, Norway, Portugal, Russia etc.)
His performances have toured on dozens of international festivals around Europe, in Russia, the United States and in the countries of former Yugoslavia (Vienna, Brussels, Rotterdam, Munich, Düsseldorf, Firenze, Budapest, Nitra, Sofia, Piatra Neamt, Timișoara, Sfântu Gheorghe, Moscow, St. Petersburg, New York, Belgrade, Novi Sad, Sarajevo, Zagreb, Rijeka, Dubrovnik, Split, Skopje, Ohrid, Ljubljana etc.). These festivals include Wiener Festwochen (Vienna, Austria), Kunstenfestivaldesarts (Brussels, Belgium), BITEF – Belgrade International Theatre Festival (Serbia), Fabbrica Europa (Firenze, Italy), Budapest Spring Festival (Hungary), Nitra International Theatre Festival (Slovakia), Sarajevo International Theatre Festival MESS and International Sarajevo Winter Festival (Bosnia and Herzegovina), Eurokaz International Theatre Festival Zagreb, Rijeka International Small Scenes Theatre Festival, Dubrovnik Summer Festival (Croatia), Paradise Regained (Rotterdam and other cities, the Netherlands), Tanzwerkstatt Europea München and Tanzhaus nrw Düsseldorf (Germany), Balkan Theatre Space International Theatre Festival St. Petersburg and Moscow Footlights – International Festival of Contemporary Dance (Russia), MOT Skopje International Theatre Festival and International Ohrid Festival (Macedonia), Exodos International Theatre Festival Ljubljana (Slovenia),  Piatra Neamt, Timișoara and Sfântu Gheorghe International Theatre Festivals (Romania), and on all other most important regional theatre festivals in the countries of former Yugoslavia (Sterijino pozorje in Novi Sad, Jugoslovenski pozorišni festival "Bez prevoda" Užice, Međunarodni festival pozorišne klasike Vršac, Gavelline večeri Zagreb, Marulićevi dani Split, Zlatni lav Umag, Splitsko ljeto, Grad teatar Budva, Borštnikovo srečanje Maribor, Primorski poletni festival Koper, etc.)

Janežič is a recipient of some dozens of prizes and awards including Borštnik award, four Sterija awards, two MESS Golden Laurel Wreath awards, two Ardalion Awards, two Grand prix Golden Lion awards, Golden Mask, Golden Bird and Judita awards, two dr. Djuro Rošić awards, and other Grand Prix, international critic and audience awards (including BITEF audience award for best performance) and awards for directing.

Tomi Janežič teaches acting and theatre directing at the University of Ljubljana (Slovenia) – Academy of Theatre, Radio, Film and Television. He is also a Visiting professor of University of Novi Sad (Serbia) at the Academy of Arts (Acting Master Class) and Faculty of Technical Sciences (Art applied to Architecture, Technique and Design). He lectured at the University of Arts in Belgrade (Serbia) within the interdisciplinary doctoral studies program (Space in Dramatic Art and Architecture of the Scenic Space), at the Academy of Arts (Acting) of the University of Osijek (Croatia), the Faculty of Humanistic Studies of the University of Primorska (Slovenia), within the postgraduate programs at the Faculty of Cognitive Sciences and the Faculty of Pedagogy (Psychodrama) of the University of Ljubljana (Slovenia), at Oslo National Academy of Arts (Norway) and Nordic Institute of Stage and Studio – The Arts University College of Oslo (Norway), at Act – Escola de Actores – Lisbon (Portugal), in the frame of Metodi Festival (International Meeting of Acting Methods and Approaches) – Tuscany (Italy)  and several other international theatre festivals (BITEF, NITRA, Desire Central Station, TESZT, MIT Fest, FIST, etc.).

Janežič has been a speaker at a number of international meetings, seminars and workshops in the field of theatre, acting and psychodrama both in Slovenia and abroad – in recent seasons at the International FEPTO meeting (2010), International Theatre Conference on Dramatic and Post-dramatic Theatre (2009) and International Theatre Conference on Chekhov (2010) in the frame of BITEF festival in Belgrade (Serbia), Directors-Actors Film Workshop – Sofia (Bulgaria) (2010), Festival of Slovenian Drama (2010, 2011), Firenze Psychoanalytic Centre (2015) etc. As a psychodrama psychotherapist he has been directing a permanent psychodrama group since 2010.

Janežič was an invited artist at the New European Theatre NET – Moscow (Russia), Theorem Meeting – Festival Avignon (France), Forum Wiener Festwochen – Vienna (Austria), Residence and Reflection Project – Kunstenfestivaldesarts – Brussels (Belgium), Knjizevni susreti Sarajevo – International Meeting of Playwrights and Theatre Artists (Bosnia and Herzegovina),  etc.

Tomi Janežič has been described as: 
"one of the very few researchers of acting in the present-day Europe (Prof. Ognjenka Milićević)"; "a teacher of the best method trained actors I have ever had the pleasure to work with: the level of talent and their desire to improve their craft reminded me of the Actors studio, when I first started in 1968 till Strasberg's death in 1982" (Ed Kovens); the director of the performance characterized by "an unparalleled quality in the art of acting", which "can truly shift the parameters of our emotional and intellectual reality" (Nataša Govedić);  "we can already speak about the Janežič System" (Branka Krilović).

Since 1996 he has been the artistic director, and since 2004 also the director of the Studio for Research on the Art of Acting in Ljubljana – an institute for cultural activities devoted to artistic, educational, research, and residency activities in the field of acting – within the framework of which – and in collaboration with parallel foreign organizations and artists – he has done research projects in the field of acting. His several years on-going involvement in the international research program entitled the Potentials of Acting – researching the creative and therapeutic potentials of acting – deserves special mention. In the course of last two decades Studio for Research on the Art of Acting has realized numerous international projects (theatre coproduction, research and educational programmes, artistic exchanges and residencies) and hosted a number of distinguished acting teachers and artists from all over the world. Studio has transposed most of its activities to the Janežič's work center in Krušče, a small village near Cerknica, since the beginning of the estate renovation in 2006. Krušče Workcenter for Artistic Research, Creation, Residency and Education – recognized and valued as a space for artistic investigation and reflection – hosted internationally acclaimed artists from more than twenty countries in the field of performing arts, film, music, fine arts, and literature.

Stage productions
 2015 The Man (based on the book by Viktor Frankl – "Say "'Yes"' to Life: A Psychologist Experiences the Concentration Camp" ), Tovstonogov Bolshoi Drama Theater, Saint Petersburg, Russia 
 2015 Leo Tolstoy, The Death of Ivan Ilyich, Serbian National Theatre, Novi Sad, Serbia  
 2014 B. Brecht, The Threepenny Opera, Montenegrin Royal Theater Zetski dom, Cetinje, Montenegro and Serbian National Theatre, Novi Sad, Serbia 
 2013 Plato, The Apology, Dubrovnik summer festival, Dubrovnik, Croatia 
 2012 A. P. Chekhov, The Seagull, Serbian National Theatre, Novi Sad, Serbia  
 2011 John The Second, Fičo balet and Studio for Research on the Art of Acting, Bunker, Ljubljana, Slovenia
 2009 Tatjana Gromača, The Negro, Croatian National Theatre Ivan Zajc, Rijeka, Croatia,
 2009 Mikhail Bulgakov, Molière – The Cabal of Hypocrites, Slovenian National Theatre, Ljubljana, Slovenia
 2008 Romeo and Public, "En-knap" and Studio for Research on the Art of Acting, Ljubljana, Slovenia
 2008 Milena Marković, The Forest is glowing, Atelier 212 theatre, Belgrade, Serbia 
 2008 John Janez Ivan, Fičo ballet and Studio for Research on the Art of Acting, Glej theatre, Slovenia, New Dance Alliance, New York, ZDA, Moscow ballet, Moscow, Russia
 2008 W. Shakespeare, The King Lear, Koper theatre and Presern theatre, Kranj, Slovenia
 2007 Ljubomir Simović, The travelling troupe Šopalović, Atelier 212 theatre, Belgrade, Serbia  
 2006 Acting study 29.7.1993 – work in progress, part of the project  Acting Please!, Studio for Research on the Art of Acting and Glej theatre, Ljubljana, Slovenij
 2006 Milena Marković, Simeon the Foundiling, Serbian National Theatre and Sterijino pozorje, Novi Sad, Serbia
 2006 Peter Shaffer, Amadeus, Croatian National Theatre Ivan Zajc, Rijeka, Croatia
 2005 No words – ("When I left, I was reminded of those scenes from Bergman"), Studio for Research on the Art of Acting  and Experimental theatre Glej, Ljubljana, Slovenia, CSS Udine, Videm, Italy
 2005 M. Maeterlinck, The Blind, Macedonian National theater, Skopje, Macedonia
 2005 W. Shakespeare, The King Lear, Atelier 212 theater, Belgrade, Serbia
 2004 Conor McPherson, Dublin carol, Koper theater, Slovenia
 2004 No Acting Please! – acting research, second part of the Trilogy on acting, Teatar ITD, Zagreb, Croatia
 2003 Paula Vogel, The Baltimore waltz, Ptuj city theater, Slovenia
 2003 Untitled, Studio for Research on the Art of Acting, Ljubljana, Slovenia
 2003 No Acting Please! – acting research, first part of the Trilogy on acting: Norec, Slovenian youth theater, Ljubljana, Slovenia
 2002 F. M. Dostoyevsky, Crime and Punishment, Croatian National Theatre Ivan Zajc, Rijeka, Croatia
 2002 theatre production of acting research program "House of peace... is like going across a field of poppies and do not think of picking a flower or What color is laugh?", Studio for Research on the Art of Acting and  Slovenian youth theater, Ljubljana, Slovenia
 2001 The Dybbuk (based on Ansky),  Academy for Theatre, Radio, Film, and Television (AGRFT), Ljubljana, Slovenia
 2001 A.P. Chekhov, The three sisters,  Slovenian youth theater, Ljubljana, Slovenia
 2001 acting project "To act", Studio for Research on the Art of Acting, Ljubljana, Slovenia
 2000 E. Rostand, Cyrano de Bergerac, Croatian National Theatre, Split, Croatia
 2000 Stalker /based on the novel by Strugatsky brothers and movie by Andrei Tarkovsky/, Studio for Research on the Art of Acting and Zagreb Actors Studio, Croatia, in coproduction with  Festival estivo del Litorale, Kopar, Sečovlje, Croatia/Slovenia
 1999 A.P. Chekhov, The Seagull, Slovenian youth theater, Ljubljana, Slovenia
 1998 G. Buchner, Woyzeck, Slovenian National Theater, Nova Gorica, Slovenia
 1998 Sophocles, Oedipus Rex, Slovenian youth theater, Ljubljana, Slovenia
 1997 T. Janežič, We sing to thee or Emptines no. 2,  Studio for Research on the Art of Acting, Ljubljana, Slovenia
 1997 T. Janežič, Emptiness, old story from my village, Ptuj City Theater, Slovenia
 1996 P. Shaffer, Equus, Ljubljana City Theater, Ljubljana, Slovenia
 1995 J. Genet, The Maids, Academy for Theatre, Radio, Film, and Television (AGRFT), Ljubljana, Slovenia
 1994 Euripides, The Phoenician Women (with scenes from Antigone by Sophocles), Academy for Theatre, Radio, Film, and Television (AGRFT), Ljubljana, Slovenia
 1993 Sketches /research and acting sketch, art colony in Šmartno v Goriških brdih, Slovenia
 1992 Klabund Chalk circle, SAGS, Slovenia

References

External links 
 Tomi Janezic at the Internet Movie Database – https://www.imdb.com/name/nm1021672/ 
 Tomi Janezic at sigledal.org – http://www.sigledal.org/geslo/Tomi_Jane%C5%BEi%C4%8D
 About "The Seagull", A.P.Chekhov, directed by Tomi Janezic, Serbian National Theatre, Novi Sad –  https://web.archive.org/web/20140223001458/http://www.snp.org.rs/static/ENGL/DRAMA/THE%20SEAGULL.html 
 "The Method Manual" by Ed Kovens, foreword by Tomi Janezic (Google books preview) – https://books.google.si/books?id=mfwGjXXBswYC&pg=PR9&lpg=PR9&dq=tomi+janezic&source=bl&ots=RXqdTMsMw3&sig=lvgHMEZjv8lPh2UoRLesUh8GKg8&hl=en&sa=X&ei=uMfSUvXbAYaLyAO77ICABg&redir_esc=y#v=onepage&q=tomi%20janezic&f=false
 Conversation with prof. Radivoje Dinulovic on the topic of scenic design, Novi Sad, Serbia, 2014 – https://www.youtube.com/watch?v=EGLfIMAsBPU 
 Conversation with Ivica Buljan on MESS 2013 (video in Croatian) – https://www.youtube.com/watch?v=Rm1NOvfXONI
 http://zdus.si/tomi-janezic/ (article in Slovenian)

Living people
Slovenian theatre directors
People from Ljubljana in health professions
1972 births
Academic staff of the University of Ljubljana
Theatre people from Ljubljana